Blackwood distillery was a Scottish distiller founded in July 2002 with the aim of building Shetland's first Scotch whisky distillery run by Caroline Whitfield. Products included Muckle Flugga whisky, Jago's cream liqueur and Blackwoods gin and vodka.  In May 2008, the company went into administration, but a new company, Catfirth Ltd, was established to continue the whisky business and took over the remaining stocks of whisky. The stocks of the vodka and gin brands were sold to a company called Blavod Extreme Spirits.  In 2013, word of further funding came through, with a promise that a distillery will open soon after but by 2015 that had not happened.

The Shetland Distillery Company, which produces the Shetland Reel Gin range is the most northerly distillery in the United Kingdom.

Products
The company's first products went on sale in October 2003:
 JAGOs vanilla vodka cream (17% abv)
 Blackwood's Vintage Dry Gin (40% abv)
 Blackwoods 60 Gin (60%abv)
 Blackwood's Premium Nordic Vodka (40% abv)

See also
 List of whisky brands
 List of distilleries in Scotland

References

External links
Blackwood Distillery on Shetlopedia
Official Blackwood website

Gins
Scottish malt whisky
2002 establishments in Scotland
Companies established in 2002
Companies based in Shetland